The A2030 is a road in Hampshire.  The road starts off at junction 5 of the A3(M), near the village of Bedhampton.  The road then runs west along the base of Portsdown Hill, following the old route of the A27 into Portsmouth until it reaches the Drayton area.  This section of road is called Havant Road.

It then turns sharply south directly between Drayton and Farlington, and begins to run down towards the main areas of Portsmouth on Portsea Island.  Just before crossing onto Portsea Island is a busy junction with the current A27.  The road then continues along the east coast of the island before bearing right coming to a junction with Milton Road.  This section of the road is known as Eastern Road, apart from the southernmost 100 m which is called Velder Avenue.

From here it winds its way across Portsmouth, changing names a number of times, before terminating at a junction with the A3 in Portsmouth City centre.

Being one of only three roads between Portsea Island and the mainland, it is always busy and often becomes congested during rush hours.

See also
Great Britain road numbering system

Roads in England
Transport in Hampshire